Little Diversified Architectural Consulting is diverse, trans-disciplinary, global design firm founded in 1964 and born in Charlotte, North Carolina. Little's value proposition is based around delivering Results Beyond Architecture that elevate their clients' performance, providing unexpected, measurable results. At the core of Little's design work is Regenerative Design, and a focus on sustainability centered around a focus on Health, Energy, Water and Social Equity. Little currently has over 400 employees across 5 offices, nationwide: Charlotte, NC, Durham, NC, Orlando, FL, Newport Beach, CA and Arlington, VA, and five project design areas of practice: Community, Engineering, Healthcare, Retail and Workplace. It was the named the largest firm in North Carolina in 2013  when it was also named the American Institute of Architects Firm of the Year in North Carolina.

Little has participated in a number of high-profile projects across the globe.

Notable Projects 
NASCAR Hall of Fame, Charlotte, NC

Ally Charlotte Center, Charlotte, NC

Campbell University, Multiple Projects, Buies Creek, NC

NeoCity Academy High School, Kissimmee, FL

References

External links
 
Instagram
LinkedIn page
 Top 50 US Architectural Firms, ArchDaily

Architecture firms based in North Carolina
Modernist architects
Design companies established in 1964
1964 establishments in North Carolina
Companies based in Charlotte, North Carolina
Postmodern architects